Kyle William Soller (born July 1, 1983) is an American film, stage, and television actor. His accolades include one Olivier Award, and three Evening Standard Theatre Awards.

Born in Connecticut and raised in Virginia, he attended the College of William & Mary before graduating from London's Royal Academy of Dramatic Art in 2008, after which he remained based in the United Kingdom. He has appeared in several films, such as Anna Karenina (2012) and Marrowbone (2017), and earned an Olivier Award for Best Actor for his performance in The Inheritance, staged at the Young Vic Theatre in 2018.

Early life
Soller was born July 1, 1983 in Bridgeport, Connecticut, and raised in Alexandria, Virginia. He attended the College of William & Mary, where he majored in art history. During his third year of studies, he spent a semester abroad studying at the Royal Academy of Dramatic Art (RADA) in London, and was offered admission into the academy. Soller left the College of William & Mary and relocated to London to complete his studies at RADA.

Career
Soller acted in various plays following his graduation from RADA in 2008, and his breakthrough year came in 2011 where he starred in The Glass Menagerie at the Young Vic, The Government Inspector also at the Young Vic and in The Faith Machine at the Royal Court Theatre. Based on these performances he won the Evening Standard Theatre Award for Outstanding Newcomer.

In 2012 Soller starred in the West End hit A Long Day's Journey into Night by Eugene O'Neill with David Suchet, Laurie Metcalf and Trevor White at the Apollo Theatre, and in the Roundabout Theatre Company's production of Cyrano de Bergerac as Christian at the American Airlines Theatre in New York.

Soller appeared in BBC Three's comedy Bad Education as the new teacher Mr Schwimer. Between 2015 and 2016, he appeared in BBC One's Poldark, playing Ross Poldark's cousin, Francis.  And in The Hollow Crown, in the role of Clifford. He starred as an expert on apocalypses, Scotty, in Sky 1's comedy drama You, Me and the Apocalypse. In 2015, he appeared as Gerald Croft in Helen Edmundson's award-winning BBC adaptation of An Inspector Calls.

In 2022 he appeared in the Disney+ show Star Wars: Andor.

Personal life
Soller is married to actress Phoebe Fox, whom he met at RADA.

Filmography

Film

Television

Theatre

Awards and nominations

Theatre

References

External links

1983 births
Living people
Male actors from Bridgeport, Connecticut
Alumni of RADA
College of William & Mary alumni
American expatriate male actors in the United Kingdom